Plauto de Barros Guimarães (25 April 1925 – 10 October 1972) was an Olympic freestyle swimmer from Brazil, who participated in a Summer Olympics for his native country. He was born in São Paulo.

He was a member of Esporte Clube Pinheiros, São Paulo.

At the 1948 Summer Olympics in London, he swam the 100-metre freestyle, not reaching the finals. He was also ranked to compete in the 4×200-metre freestyle, but at the Brazilian trials, Willy Otto Jordan persuaded the Brazilian principals to make a new classification proof, where Willy took the vacancy of Plauto.

In 1955, he had already retired from swimming.

References

1925 births
1972 deaths
Swimmers at the 1948 Summer Olympics
Olympic swimmers of Brazil
Brazilian male freestyle swimmers
Swimmers from São Paulo
20th-century Brazilian people